Cyperus surinamensis, also known as the tropical flatsedge, is a sedge of the family Cyperaceae that is native to the Americas.

Description
It blooms between late spring and early fall producing reddish-brown flowers.

Distribution
The species is native to the south east of the United States of America, Mexico and parts of Central America. It is an alien species in Western Australia but is found in the Kimberley region.

Ecology

See also
List of Cyperus species

References

Plants described in 1772
surinamensis
Taxa named by Christen Friis Rottbøll